GSOC may refer to:

 Garda Síochána Ombudsman Commission, investigates complaints against the Irish police
 Graduate Student Organizing Committee, a trade union at New York University
 German Space Operations Center (Deutsches Raumfahrtkontrollzentrum); See Flight controller
 Google Summer of Code, an international annual program